The Dogue de Bordeaux, Bordeaux Mastiff, French Mastiff or Bordeauxdog is a large French mastiff breed. A typical brachycephalic mastiff breed, the Bordeaux is a very powerful dog, with a very muscular body. This muscular breed has been put to work pulling carts, transporting heavy objects, and guarding flocks.

History

The Dogue de Bordeaux was known in France as early as the 14th century, particularly in southern France in the region around Bordeaux. Hence, the city lent its name to this large dog. The breed was first exhibited in France in 1863 after which time it gained in popularity not only in their home country but in other parts of the world. The first record of the Dogue de Bordeaux in the UK can be seen in the Kennel Club Gazette in 1897. The breed was officially recognised by the Kennel Club (UK) in 1997 but it was not until 2001 that the Kennel Club (UK) accepted an interim breed standard. A uniform breed type of the Bordeaux dog did not exist before about 1920.

The French placed emphasis on keeping the old breeding line pure. Black masks were considered an indication of the crossing in of the English Mastiff. As an important indication of purity of the breed, attention was paid to the self-colored (pink) nose, lighter eye color (dark amber), and red mask. They were originally bred with huge heads; a pioneer for the breed in Germany, Werner Preugschat once wrote:

What am I supposed to do with a dog that has a monstrous skull and is at most able to carry it from the food dish to its bed?

The Dogue de Bordeaux was at one time known to come in two varieties, Dogues and Doguins, the Dogue being considerably larger than the Doguin. The smaller Doguin has withered away to nothing more than a mention in breed history books and is now extinct.

The history of the breed is believed to predate the Bullmastiff and the Bulldog. It is said that the Dogue can be found in the background of the Bullmastiff, and others claim that the Dogue and mastiff breeds were both being accomplished at the same time. Another theory is the Dogue de Bordeaux originates from the Tibetan Mastiff and it is also said that the Dogue is related to the Greek Molossus used for war.

As there was a breed similar to the Dogue de Bordeaux in Rome at the time of Julius Caesar's reign, possibly a cousin of the Neapolitan Mastiff. Others suggest that the Dogue de Bordeaux is a descendant of a breed which existed in ancient France, the Dogues de Bordeaux of Aquitaine. Whichever theory is true, the Dogue de Bordeaux shares the same common links as all modern mastiffs.

The Dogue de Bordeaux was once classified into three varieties, the Parisian, the Toulouse and the Bordeaux, types which were bred depending on the region of France and the jobs it was required to do. The ancestral Dogue de Bordeaux had various coat colors, such as brindle and a majority of white markings that carried fully up the legs. It had scissor bites in some regions, undershot in others; a big head or a small head, a large body or a small body; very inconsistent in type. Another controversial aspect was the mask, red (brown), black or none. The Dogue de Bordeaux of Bordeaux of the time also sported cropped ears. Regardless, it had a general type similar to today's Dogue de Bordeaux.

Breeding

In 1863, the first canine exhibition was held at the "Jardin d'Acclimatation" in Paris, France. The winner of the Dogue de Bordeaux was a female named Magentas. The Dogue de Bordeaux was then given the name of the capital of its region of origin, today's Dogue de Bordeaux.

During the 1960s, a group of breeders of the Dogue de Bordeaux in France, headed by Raymond Triquet, worked on the rebuilding of the foundation of the breed. In 1970, a new standard was written for the breed, with the most recent update in 1995. This standard is the basis of the standard written for the AKC in 2005.

Although the Dogue de Bordeaux first arrived in the USA in the 1890s for the show ring, the first documented Dogue de Bordeaux of modern times appeared in 1959 by the name of Fidelle de Fenelon. Between 1969 and 1980, imported Dogues de Bordeaux in the US were scarce, limited to a few breeders who worked closely with the French Dogue de Bordeaux Club, the SADB. The breed was first "officially" introduced to American purebred enthusiasts in an article written in 1982 by the American anthropologist Dr. Carl Semencic for Dog World magazine. When Semencic's first article on the breed was published, there were no Dogues de Bordeaux in the United States. There were 600 examples left in the world, mostly in France, the Netherlands and East Berlin, and the breed's numbers were on the decline. Much later, in 1989, the typical American family saw the Dogue de Bordeaux for the first time on the big screen in Touchstone's movie Turner & Hooch about a policeman and his canine partner.

Since then, the Dogue de Bordeaux has taken hold in the United States and can be found in greatly increasing numbers across the country. The Dogue de Bordeaux has been supported by multiple breed clubs throughout the years, and has finally found its way to full American Kennel Club recognition through the assistance of the Dogue de Bordeaux Society of America. Since 1997, the society has helped bring the breed to the point in which full AKC recognition could be achieved.

Appearance 

The Dogue de Bordeaux is a well balanced, muscular and massive dog with a powerful build. The distance from the deepest point of the chest to the ground is slightly less than the depth of the chest. A massive head with proper proportions and features is an important characteristic of the breed. The breed is set somewhat low to the ground and is not tall like the English Mastiff. The body of the Dogue de Bordeaux is thick-set, with a top-line that has a slight dip (topline is never completely straight) and a gentle rounded croup. The front legs should be straight and heavy-boned, well up on pasterns, down to tight cat-like feet. The straight tail, beginning thickly at the base and then tapering to a point at the end, should not reach lower than the hocks, and is set and carried low. The breed is to be presented in a completely natural condition with intact ears, tail, and natural dewclaws. It should be evaluated equally for correctness in conformation, temperament, movement, and overall structural soundness.

Weight 
There is no formally stated maximum weight, but dogs must be balanced with regard to their overall type and the conformation standards of the breed.

Height 
Deviation from these margins is considered a fault.

Head 

The massive head is a crucial breed characteristic. The Dogue de Bordeaux is claimed to have the largest head in the canine world, in proportion to the rest of the body. For males, the circumference of the head, measured at the widest point of the skull, is roughly equal to the dog's height at the withers (shoulders). For females, the circumference may be slightly less. When viewed from the front or from above, the head of the Dogue forms a trapezoid shape with the longer top-line of the skull, and the shorter line of the underjaw, forming the parallel sides of the trapezoid. The jaw is undershot and powerful. The Dogue should always have a black or red mask that can be distinguished from the rest of the coat around and under the nose, including the lips and eye rims. The nose color in red-masked dogs should be brown, in black-masked dogs, it must be black. The muzzle should be at most a third of the total length of the head and no shorter than a quarter of the length of the head, the ideal being between the two extremes. The upper lip hangs thickly down over the lower jaw. The upper lips of the Dogue de Bordeaux hangs over the lower lips. The skin on the neck is loose, forming a noticeable dewlap, but should not resemble that of a Neapolitan Mastiff. Small pendant ears top the head, but should not be long and hound like.

Coat 

The standard specifies the coat to be 'short, fine, and soft to the touch'. Color varies from shades of fawn (light, coppery red) to mahogany (dark, brownish red) with a black, brown, or red mask, although the red mask is true to the breed. White markings are permitted on the tips of the toes and on the chest, but white on any other part of the body is considered a fault, and a disqualifying one if the pigmentation goes beyond the neck.

Temperament 
The Dogue de Bordeaux typically is well tempered. They are generally described by multiple breed standards as a “gentle giant”, based upon their stocky, low barring and strong exterior, but having a loving and sweet personality. This breed is known to be laid-back and is happiest lounging around the house and spending time with the family. They are typically very devoted to their owners and though seen as a calmer breed are also good guarddogs. This breed is also very protective of their family. Dogue de Bordeaux’s were initially bred as war dogs, then used for hunting and guarding French estates. Though not used for that purpose now, it allows them to easily dominate a situation if provoked or in protection of their family. You may see them watching through the window ready to alert at a sign of danger.

Much like other mastiff breeds, Dogue de Bordeaux’s tend to have a strong personality and are very stubborn. This mixed with their natural strength makes strict training crucial starting at a young age. This includes proper socialization so they do not end up with potential aggression towards other dogs or strangers.  It is highly recommended that you do not let this dog become the leader of the family pack. It will be hard to manage such a dominant dog in this scenario.  This also adds to the fact that you should be cautious in leaving this dog alone with younger children and the elderly. Even though a loving, protective and gentle breed when excited even a puppy can take an adult to the ground.  These dogs do not understand their own strength and could cause harm in situations where it was not the intention.

Contrary to their muscular build, Dogue de Bordeaux’s are a lazier breed. As puppies they tend to switch from being calm and cute to being very rambunctious but as they get older they grow out of it almost completely. They do enjoy playing, going for walks and lounging on the couch with their loved ones though they do tend to snore very loudly and drool excessively. They are happiest when around their family and will lay on your feet and lean on you as often as possible.

Health

While larger breeds of canines tend to have shorter life expectancy, the life expectancy of the Dogue is still shorter than even breeds of comparable or larger size. According to data collected by the Dogue De Bordeaux Society of America, the average lifespan of the breed is 5 to 6 years. A veterinary database in the UK showed similar figures. In the American survey, the oldest dog in the record was 12 years old. However, the acting dog who played Hooch in the 1989 film, Turner and Hooch, died at the age of 14. The Society is actively recording dogs that are 7 years old or older to celebrate the longer-lived dogs.

Because of its brachycephalic head, the Dogue can be affected by breathing problems. Some may be intolerant of heat or exercise as a result. The FCI standard considers excessive shortness of breath and raspy breathing in the Dogue a severe fault. The brachycephalic head shape can also encourage ectropion—an outward rolling of the lower eyelid— which can lead to conjunctivitis (eye inflammation) and bacterial infections. Under the UK Kennel Club's Breed Watch system, the Dogue is classed as a Category 3 breed (formerly High Profile Breed), meaning it is a breed "where some dogs have visible conditions or exaggerations that can cause pain or discomfort."

Aortic stenosis is a disease of the heart valve in which the opening of the aortic valve is narrowed. Symptoms include exercise intolerance, exertional syncope (fainting from physical exertion) and sudden death. One study suggests a high predisposition in the breed. No severe cases were found in adult dogs, and most moderate to severely affected dogs died before one year of age, leading the authors to speculate that the disease is more severe in the Dogue than in other breeds.

Another heart problem in the breed is dilated cardiomyopathy, a condition in which the heart becomes weakened and enlarged and cannot pump blood efficiently. Some affected dogs may die suddenly without showing any signs of problems. Others may die from congestive heart failure after several weeks or months. Affected dogs are often euthanized at an early stage to avoid suffering.

An estimated 5% of dogs may be affected by footpad hyperkeratosis, a thickening of the footpad and sometimes nose. Lesions usually occur at the age of 6 months. X-rays submitted voluntarily to the Orthopedic Foundation for Animals shows that more than 50% of Dogues in the database are affected by hip dysplasia. Over 21% are affected by elbow dysplasia. Approximately 3% of Dogues suffer from retinal dysplasia. Patella luxation affects around 2% of Dogues.

Reproduction
Data from the Norwegian Kennel Club indicates a mean litter size of 8.1 puppies (ranging from 2-17) for the breed. The breed has a high stillborn and early neonatal mortality rate, with a stillborn rate of 14.2% and early neonatal mortality (death within 1 week from birth) of 10.4%. The average across all breeds in the study was 4.3% stillbirth and 3.7% early neonatal mortality. Excluding stillborn and early deaths, the mean litter size is 6.1. UK Kennel Club data shows that 27.8% (5 of 18) of Dogue litters were delivered by caesarean section.

See also
 Dogs portal
 List of dog breeds

References

Further reading
Dogue de Bordeaux, Janish, Joseph. Kennel Club Books, 2003. 
The Saga of the Dogue de Bordeaux, Triquet, Raymond. Bas Bosch Press
The World of Dogues De Bordeaux. Bas Bosch Press

External links

Dog breeds originating in France
FCI breeds
Mastiffs